The Göttingen minipig (also known as the Göttinger or "Goettingen" minipig) is a breed of small swine. Beside being known for their exceptionally small size, the Göttingen minipigs are known for their docile nature and very clean and well-characterized health status. Raising of this breed began in the late 1960s at the Institute of Animal Breeding and Genetics (Institut für Tierzucht und Haustiergenetik) at the University of Göttingen, Germany, by crossbreeding the Minnesota mini-pig, the Vietnamese Pot-bellied pig, and the German Landrace pig. Göttingen minipigs are highly favored as pets, however, the breed was specifically developed for biomedical research. Today, they are extensively bred at four separate locations globally.

History
The Göttingen minipig was raised for use in biomedical research. Smaller pigs required less space and feed, were easier to handle, and required a lesser amount of the compound being tested.

The Göttingen minipig was the first miniature pig breed to be developed in Europe. They were available to the German biomedical research community from the late 1960s. Breeding began by crossing the Minnesota minipig, obtained from the Hormel Institute in the United States, and the Vietnamese pot-bellied pig, obtained from a German zoo. Subsequent cross breeding with the German Landrace produced the white/pink skin pigmentation which characterizes modern Göttingen minipigs. Breeding goals included a low body weight, good ear veins, and low inbreeding coefficients.

In 1992, the first colony of barrier-bred, microbiologically defined Göttingen minipigs were derived in Denmark. From this colony, Göttingen minipigs were provided for biomedical research performed throughout Europe and to a limited extent in North America. Beginning in 2003, a colony of Göttingen minipigs were established in the United States. Since 2010, the breed has also been available in Japan. Global use of Göttingen minipigs for biomedical research has been increasing over the past two decades.

In the United States in the 2010s, Göttingen minipigs were soon purchased and bred locally to be sold as pets, in multiple locations. They are now a popular breed of pet pig, renowned for their small size.

References

Pig breeds